Styropian – Pidżama Porno's fifth album, released in 1998 by S.P. Records. Album was recorded in Studio CZAD in Swarzędz.

Track listing

Videos
"Do nieba wzięci" 
"Gdy zostajesz u mnie na noc"

The band
Krzysztof "Grabaż" Grabowski – vocal 
Andrzej "Kozak" Kozakiewicz – guitar, vocal 
Sławek "Dziadek" Mizerkiewicz – guitar, chords
Rafał "Kuzyn" Piotrowiak – drums 
Julian "Julo" Piotrowiak – bass guitar

and also:

Marcin Świetlicki – the voice in "Gloria"
Sowa – flute 
Adaś z Jafii N. – keyboard
Maciek Szpalik – akordeon 
Dusiołek – bass guitar 
Jacek K.: clapping

orchestra:

Rafał Wiśniewski – trumpet 
Maciej Kociński – medium sax 
Maciej Kołodziejski – trombone
and the Marx Brothers

References
http://pidzamaporno.art.pl/?p=plyta&id=8

Pidżama Porno albums
1998 albums